Sandakan Heritage Trail is a trail connecting several historical sites in Sandakan, a town in the east Malaysian state of Sabah. It is marked with white concrete tiles placed on the ground showing a red footprint the words "Heritage Trail" in either black or gold.

History 
Sandakan was almost completely destroyed during Second World War. The few remaining historical relics of the former North Borneo capital was combined into a historical trails in 2003 as Sandakan Heritage Trail (SHT).

Landmarks 
At present, the eleven stations of the Heritage Trail are as follows:
 Sandakan Jamek Mosque
 MPS Square with the William Pryer Monument, the Chartered Company Monument, the Sandakan War Monument and the Sandakan Liberation Monument
 100-step staircase 
 Agnes Keith House
 Historic staircase
 Goddess of Mercy Temple
 St. Michael's and All Angels Church
 Sam Sing Kung Temple
 Malaysia fountain
 Tourist Information Centre and Sandakan Heritage Museum

References

Further reading 
 Heritage – Sandakan Heritage Trail

Sandakan
Urban heritage trails
Monuments and memorials in Malaysia
Tourist attractions in Sabah